Raymond Loran Floyd (born September 4, 1942) is an American retired golfer who has won numerous tournaments on both the PGA Tour and Senior PGA Tour, including four majors and four senior majors. He was inducted into the World Golf Hall of Fame in 1989.

Early years
Floyd was born on September 4, 1942, in Fort Bragg, North Carolina, and was raised in Fayetteville. Floyd's father L.B. had a 21-year career in the U.S. Army, much of it at Fort Bragg as the golf pro at its enlisted-men's course. He also owned a nearby driving range where Raymond and younger sister Marlene, a future LPGA Tour pro, honed their games. From an early age, Floyd could play equally well left-handed, and used his skills to enhance his allowance, winning money from soldiers on the course, as well as civilians in nearby towns.

Floyd graduated from Fayetteville High School (now named Terry Sanford High School) in 1960. Skilled in golf and baseball, he had an offer to pitch in the Cleveland Indians organization, but chose to attend the University of North Carolina in Chapel Hill, but only stayed for a semester.

Professional career
After leaving college, Floyd turned professional in 1961, and quickly established himself on the PGA Tour. His first victory came two years later at age 20 in March 1963 in Florida, winning $3,500 at the St. Petersburg Open Invitational, the first of his 22 wins on the PGA Tour, including four major championships.

Floyd won his first major title six years later at the PGA Championship in 1969, and the second came in 1976 at The Masters, by an eight-stroke margin and was won wire-to-wire. He won his second PGA Championship in 1982, after shooting a brilliant opening round of 63 in sweltering hot conditions at Southern Hills Country Club. Floyd's round of 63 was the lowest round in a major championship until 2017. Floyd finished 1982 ranked second in Mark McCormack's world golf rankings, behind only Tom Watson, who had won two majors that season; had those rankings been calculated over just two seasons, on a par with the system in place at the end of 2012, Floyd would have been ranked world number one in 1982, as he had earned more points from all events in total than Watson in both 1981 and 1982.

Floyd's fourth and final major title came at the U.S. Open in 1986 at Shinnecock Hills. After three rounds, he was tied for fifth place, three shots behind leader Greg Norman, who held the 54-hole lead at all four majors in 1986. Norman faltered on Sunday with a 75 (+5), but Floyd shot 66 to win by two strokes and became the then-oldest U.S. Open champion by a few months at 43 years and 9 months. (The record was Ted Ray's since 1920, and is now held by Hale Irwin, a champion at age 45 in 1990.)

The one major title that eluded Floyd, which prevented him from completing the career grand slam, was The Open Championship. His best result was in 1978 at St Andrews; he tied for second place, behind three-time winner Jack Nicklaus.

Floyd came very close to winning a second Green Jacket at the 1990 Masters, where he lost in a playoff to Nick Faldo. On the second playoff hole, Floyd pulled a 7-iron shot into the pond left of the 11th green. Afterward, he said, "This is the most devastating thing that's ever happened to me in my career. I've had a lot of losses, but nothing like this."

In 1992, Floyd again finished runner-up at The Masters, two strokes behind the winner Fred Couples. Floyd's final win on the PGA Tour came at the Doral-Ryder Open in 1992 at age 49, making him one of the oldest players to win a PGA Tour event. The Doral-Ryder Open victory also gave him the distinction of winning PGA Tour events in four decades, joining Sam Snead as the second player to achieve that feat. Floyd also won on the Senior PGA Tour (now PGA Tour Champions) later that season, making him the first player to win on both tours in the same year.

At the end of 1992, Floyd was ranked 14th on the Official World Golf Ranking at the age of 50, one of the highest positions ever attained by a player of that age. Floyd's successful run continued on the Senior Tour, with 14 wins between 1992 and 2000, including four senior majors and two Senior Tour Championships.

In addition to Floyd's victories on the PGA and Champions Tours, he won at least 24 additional tournaments around the world, taking his total victory tally to at least 60 events. While active, Floyd was considered by most golf experts to be the best at chipping the golf ball. He holed many shots from just off the green, the most famous may have been at the Doral-Eastern Open in 1980, where his successful birdie chip on the second hole of a sudden-death playoff defeated Jack Nicklaus.

On his decision to continue playing professional golf on the Senior Tour, Floyd spoke with Golf Digest and mused aloud: "Why do I enjoy golf after 31 years, going out there and doing things that are necessary to be competitive—having practice, having to work, having to dedicate yourself? I guess it comes down to the competition. My personality...I'm not going to play if I'm not competitive."

Floyd won the Vardon Trophy for lowest scoring average on the PGA Tour in 1983 and played for the U.S. on eight Ryder Cup teams (1969, 1975, 1977, 1981, 1983, 1985, 1991, and 1993).

Floyd was inducted into the World Golf Hall of Fame in 1989. He captained the U.S. Ryder Cup team at The Belfry in England in 1989. At a gala dinner held before the start of the matches, Floyd famously introduced his American side as "The 12 greatest players in the world." This irritated European player Nick Faldo of England, who later said that he felt Floyd's comment was inappropriate.

Floyd was an assistant Ryder Cup captain in 2008. On the eve of the Masters in 2010, Floyd announced his retirement from competitive golf. He was the honoree at Nicklaus' Memorial Tournament in 2013.

Professional wins (63)

PGA Tour wins (22)

PGA Tour playoff record (5–10)

Japan Golf Tour wins (1)

Canadian Tour wins (1)

Latin American wins (2)

Other wins (11)

Other playoff record (3–2)

Senior PGA Tour wins (14)

*Note: The 1995 Emerald Coast Classic was shortened to 36 holes due to rain.

Senior PGA Tour playoff record (3–1)

Other senior wins (12)
1992 Fuji Electric Grandslam
1994 Diners Club Matches (with Dave Eichelberger), Senior Skins Game
1995 Senior Skins Game, Senior Slam at Los Cabos, Lexus Challenge (with Michael Chiklis)
1996 Senior Skins Game, Senior Slam at Los Cabos
1997 Senior Skins Game, Lexus Challenge (with William Devane)
1998 Senior Skins Game
2006 Wendy's Champions Skins Game (with Dana Quigley)

Major championships

Wins (4)

Results timeline

CUT = missed the halfway cut (3rd round cut in 1984 Open Championship)
WD = withdrew
"T" indicates a tie for a place.

Summary

Most consecutive cuts made – 24 (1972 PGA – 1979 Masters)
Longest streak of top-10s – 3 (1976 Open Championship – 1977 Masters)

The Players Championship

Wins (1)

Results timeline

CUT = missed the halfway cut
DQ = disqualified
"T" indicates a tie for a place.

Champions Tour major championships

Wins (4)

1Floyd birdied the first extra hole.

U.S. national team appearances
Professional
Ryder Cup: 1969 (winners), 1975 (winners), 1977 (winners), 1981 (winners), 1983 (winners), 1985, 1989 (non-playing captain), 1991 (winners), 1993 (winners)
Dunhill Cup: 1985, 1986
Nissan Cup: 1985 (winners)
UBS Cup: 2001 (winners), 2002 (winners), 2003 (tie), 2004 (winners)
Wendy's 3-Tour Challenge (representing Senior PGA Tour): 1992 (PGA Tour), 1993 (winners), 1994, 1995 (winners), 1996

See also
List of golfers with most Champions Tour major championship wins
List of golfers with most Champions Tour wins
List of golfers with most PGA Tour wins
List of men's major championships winning golfers

References

External links

American male golfers
North Carolina Tar Heels men's golfers
PGA Tour golfers
PGA Tour Champions golfers
Ryder Cup competitors for the United States
Winners of men's major golf championships
Winners of senior major golf championships
World Golf Hall of Fame inductees
Golfers from North Carolina
Golfers from Florida
People from Fort Bragg, North Carolina
Sportspeople from Fayetteville, North Carolina
Sportspeople from Palm Beach, Florida
1942 births
Living people